Kettle Creek is a stream in Caldwell and Daviess County in the U.S. state of Missouri.

According to tradition, Kettle Creek was named on account of a party leaving a kettle along its course.

See also
List of rivers of Missouri

References

Rivers of Caldwell County, Missouri
Rivers of Daviess County, Missouri
Rivers of Missouri